Beatin' Aroun de Bush is a 1992 studio album by South African trumpeter Hugh Masekela. It was recorded in Hollywood and released via Novus Records label.

Reception
Jim Newsom of Allmusic wrote: "With a mix of smooth contemporary jazz, Afro-beat, and world music, Beatin' Aroun de Bush is a highly accessible presentation of Hugh Masekela's flügelhorn expertise, as well as a visit to his South African homeland. This album was completed as his native country was voting to abolish apartheid, and the music contained herein is at times mellow and melancholy, but mostly celebratory."

Track listing

References

External links

1992 albums
Hugh Masekela albums